, also known as "Sakura", is a traditional Japanese folk song depicting spring, the season of cherry blossoms. It is often sung in international settings as a song representative of Japan.

Contrary to popular belief, the song did not originate in ancient times; it was a popular, urban melody of the Edo period.

Melody 
The "Sakura Sakura" melody has been popular since the Meiji period, and the lyrics in their present form were attached then. The tune uses a pentatonic scale known as the in scale.

Expressed as diatonic notes in the major scale, the In scale is 3, 4, 6, 7, 8 (1), 10 (3); or the notes E F A B c e (nominally A minor); or in solfège Mi Fa La Ti Do Mi. The melodic scale can either be represented in older Western musical theory by the Phrygian minor or the Phrygian major mode, with the 3rd and 7th notes in the scale omitted. 

Because the melody spans a modest range, it is ideally suited to instruments that have a limited pitch range, such as the Native American flute (similar to the Shakuhachi).
The melody arranged by Ongaku Torishirabe-gakari was included in Collection of Japanese Koto Music issued in 1888, for beginning koto students in the Tokyo Academy of Music.

Lyrics 
The original lyrics are listed as the second verse in the table below. In 1941, the Ministry of Education published a new verse in Uta no hon (うたのほん 教師用 下) which was listed first, with the original verse listed second. However, there are various theories about the original lyrics. According to one theory, it is said that "Sakura Sakura" is a parody of "Saita sakura". "Saita sakura" is thought to have been made as a Japanese koto song in during the Edo period. (Lyrics: さいた桜　花見て戻る　吉野は桜　龍田は紅葉　唐崎の松　常盤常盤　深みどり)

In popular culture
 The first lines of the original verse ('sakura sakura yayoi no sora wa mi-watasu kagiri') serve as a prelude to Bon Jovi's song "Tokyo Road" from their second album 7800° Fahrenheit (released in 1985).
 In the Punch-Out!! games, an instrumental rendition is used for Piston Hondo's opening theme.
 Japanese band BUCK-TICK used this melody in live versions of their "Victims of Love" song in the early '90s.
 Alfred Reed's 1994 Fifth Symphony "Sakura" is based on this folk song.
 British cellist Julian Lloyd Webber and French pianist Jason Kouchak recorded Sakura on Lloyd's album Cello Moods in 1998 and presented by Olympic ice skater Yuka Sato in 1999. Kouchak performed his interpretation of Sakura for Emperor Akihito at London's Victoria and Albert Museum in 1998 and at the Kobe earthquake charity event in 1995.
 In 2003, Ōta Jun'ya composed "Sakura, Sakura ~ Japanize Dream" as part of the credits theme for the video game Perfect Cherry Blossom.
 Dream of the Cherry Blossoms by Keiko Abe, a virtuoso percussionist, is a five-minute piece for marimba that is based on "Sakura Sakura" that has become popular in the marimba repertoire.
 In 2007, it was selected for Nihon no Uta Hyakusen, a collection of songs and nursery rhymes widely beloved in Japan.
 In early the 2010s, Japanese singer Kiyoshi Hikawa performed the second of the two verses of "Sakura Sakura" - the first and only Enka singer to do so.
 Yukihiro Yoko, a classical guitarist, made an arrangement for his instrument, a theme with variations, in which he uses different guitar techniques to imitate the sound of the koto.
 Babymetal used this melody in their song "Megitsune" in 2013.
 In 2013 Marc Edwards recorded an album featuring three 20 minute versions of "Sakura Sakura", in a free jazz electric guitar style.
 Many electronic crosswalks in Japan play the melody as "guidance music".
 Headhunterz sampled part of this song for his 2017 song "Path of the Hunter".
 In Kara, a short film/tech demo created by David Cage and his company Quantic Dream about a robot who is built to serve humanity, the robot is asked to "sing something in Japanese", after which she sings this song. Eventually, this short film was adapted into a video game, Detroit: Become Human. In the game, one of the main characters, Markus - an android, is trying to put himself together in a junkyard. This references the short film when Markus stumbles upon a dying Kara model, the one from the film, that is still singing the song.
 The song appears in the soundtrack of the video game Total War: Shogun 2, playing during the game's campaign map mode.
 Flutist Jean-Pierre Rampal and harpist Lily Laskine recorded a version for their album Japanese Melodies for Flute and Harp.
 Sakura-Variationen (Sakura Variations) is a 2000 trio composition scored for saxophone, piano, and percussion by Helmut Lachenmann.
 "Sakura Sakura" also appeared on Wii Music as one of the song selections in the Jam Mode.
 In the Tokyo area, each train station has its own distinctive jingle used to signal train departures. The jingle for the Komagome and Musashi-Koganei stations are based on "Sakura Sakura".
 Hololive Production virtual youtuber, Akai Haato used this melody in a scary version of the song, jokingly talking about herself.
  In the video game Genshin Impact the background song of the Archon of Inazuma (a region inspired by Japan) uses a musical arrangement inspired by this song.
  Canis Canem Edit use melody of Sakura Sakura for ConSumo minigame.

References

External links 

  Sakura Sakura played in 1959 by three artists from Tokyo's University of Art on three different Koto's (17 string, 13 string and 9 string) 
 Link to mp3 recording of Sakura, Sakura, the Japanese lyrics with another verse, an English translation and sheet music
 

Japanese folk songs
Japanese-language songs
Japanese songs
Year of song unknown
Songs about cherry blossom
de:Japanische Kirschblüte#Das Sakura-Lied